George H. Brown (1913–2001) was a British film producer.

Early life
His father, a pilot in the Royal Flying Corps, was shot down and taken prisoner by the Germans during the First World War. He went to live with relatives in Barcelona. His mother, Nancy Hambley Hughes, was an actress-singer with the D'Oyly Carte Company.

Brown worked as a stuntman, bit player, singer and dancer. He worked as third assistant director on The House of the Spaniard (1936), and assistant director on Fire Over England (1936). He was production assistant on the first three movies for Mayflower Films and married Maureen O'Hara briefly (1939-1941). Brown then went to work on The Proud Valley (1939).

During World War two he worked in the RAF Film Unit in the North African desert.

His breakthrough film as producer was Hotel Sahara (1951) based on his own story for which he raised finance.

He remarried in 1948 to Bettina Kohr who predeceased him in 1998. They had a daughter Tina and a son Christopher.

Select Credits
The House of the Spaniard (1936) – 3rd AD
Fire Over England (1936) – 1st AD
Vessel of Wrath (1938) – production associate
St Martin's Lane (1938) – production associate
Jamaica Inn (1939) – production associate
The Proud Valley (1940) – production associate
49th Parallel (1941) – in charge of production
Journey Together (1945) – associate producer
School for Secrets (1946) – co-producer
Vice Versa (1947) – producer
Fame is the Spur (1947) – producer
Sleeping Car to Trieste (1948) – producer
The Chiltern Hundreds (1949) – producer
Hotel Sahara (1951) – writer, producer
Made in Heaven (1952) – producer, story
Desperate Moment (1953) – producer, writer
The Seekers (1954) – producer
Jacqueline (1956) – producer
Dangerous Exile (1957) – producer
Rooney (1958)
Tommy the Toreador (1959) – producer, writer
The Boy Who Stole a Million (1960) – producer
Double Bunk (1961) – producer
Murder She Said (1961) – producer
Village of Daughters  (1962) – producer
Kill or Cure (1962) – producer
Murder at the Gallop (1963)
Ladies Who Do (1963) – producer
Go Kart Go (1964) – producer
Guns at Batasi (1964) – producer
Runaway Railway (1966) – producer
Finders Keepers (1966) – story, producer
The Trap (1966) – producer
A Ghost of a Chance (1968) – producer
The Waiters  (1968) (short) – producer
Up in the Air (1969) – producer
Hoverbug (1969) – producer
Assault (1971) – producer
Revenge (1971) - producer
All Coppers Are... (1972) – producer
Innocent Bystanders (1973) – producer
Penny Gold (1974) – producer
Open Season (1974) – producer

References

External links

1913 births
2001 deaths
British film producers